Miller Peak, at , is the second-highest mountain in Cochise County, Arizona (after Chiricahua Peak). Located approximately 10 miles south of Sierra Vista, Arizona, it is the highest mountain in the Huachuca mountain range and a popular local hiking destination. The Miller Peak Wilderness encompasses 20,190 acres and is managed by the Coronado National Forest. This is also the most southerly peak and land area to rise above 9,000 feet in the continental United States. The area was affected by the 2011 Monument fire and most of the pine trees seen in older photographs were burned and destroyed.  Scrub oak are beginning to replace the areas that were previously covered by pine.

Google “Satellite” images from 2018 would seem to show that many of the pre-fire pine and fir trees are still there and very much alive.  Furthermore, the satellite images also tend to suggest that in the few locations where 100% tree kill took place, the forest is already beginning to regenerate.

Hiking up Miller Peak
Perhaps the most well-known trailhead is found at the end of Miller Canyon Road, near Hereford, Arizona. Other popular trails include the Montezuma Pass trailhead in the Coronado National Forest and the Carr Peak trailhead, but the short trail to the summit off the main Crest Trail can be reached from nearly any other trail in the Huachucas. Notable landmarks along the way include Bathtub Springs and Bear Saddle. Nearby Carr Peak can be reached in the same day, along the Crest Trail.

See also
 List of mountains and hills of Arizona by height
 List of Ultras of the United States

References

External links
 
 
 
 

Landforms of Cochise County, Arizona
Miller Peak
Mountains of Cochise County, Arizona